Enlhet (Eenlhit), or Northern Lengua, is a language of the Paraguayan Chaco, spoken by the northern Enxet people. It is also known as Vowak and Powok.

In Filadelfia (Paraguayan Chaco) there is an organization that advocates for Enlhet language.

Phonology

Vowels 
Three vowel sounds are noted phonemically as /a ɛ ɔ/.

Consonants

See also
 Languages of Paraguay

References

Languages of Paraguay
Mascoian languages
Articles citing ISO change requests
Chaco linguistic area